This article lists players who have recently captained the senior Westmeath county hurling team in the Christy Ring Cup, the Joe McDonagh Cup, the Leinster Senior Hurling Championship and the All-Ireland Senior Hurling Championship.

List of captains

References

Hurlers
Westmeath
+Captains